Sauron is a supervillain appearing in American comic books published by Marvel Comics. The character was created by writer Roy Thomas and artist Neal Adams, and made his first appearance in The X-Men #59 (August 1969).

Sauron is the alter ego of physician Dr. Karl Lykos. After being bitten by mutant pterodactyls, Lykos was transformed into an energy vampire, able to absorb the life force of others through touch. If Lykos absorbs the life force of mutants, he transforms into a humanoid Pteranodon, gaining increased strength and speed in the process. However, this also causes Sauron to gain control over Lykos. Throughout his history, Sauron has often been depicted as inhabiting the hidden prehistoric jungle of the Savage Land and as an enemy of the X-Men.

Outside of comics, the character has appeared in animated series, video games, merchandise and has been referenced in film. In the cartoons X-Men and Hulk and the Agents of S.M.A.S.H., Karl Lykos / Sauron was voiced by Robert Bockstael and Steven Blum, respectively, and by John Kassir in the action role-playing game video game X-Men Legends II: Rise of Apocalypse.

Creation and conception
The character was created by writer Roy Thomas and artist Neal Adams, though the two differ in their accounts of which of them was responsible for specific aspects of the character. He first fully appeared as Sauron in X-Men #60 (September 1969).

Thomas and Adams originally envisioned Sauron as a bat-like creature, but when they consulted with the Comics Code Authority, they were told that an energy vampire with a bat body might fall under the Code's prohibition on the use of vampires. To get around this problem, Thomas and Adams tweaked his appearance to that of the most bat-like animal they could think of—a pterodactyl—which in turn led them to have Sauron inhabit the hidden prehistoric jungle of the Savage Land.

Fictional character biography

Early life
Karl Lykos was the son of an explorer's guide. As a teenager, he accompanied his father to Tierra del Fuego as the elder Lykos guided a wealthy client named Mr. Anderssen and Anderssen's young daughter, Tanya. While defending Tanya from mutant pterodactyls, Karl was bitten by one of the creatures. During his recovery, he discovered that he could now drain the life-force of other organisms. He found himself repeatedly tempted to use his new power, feeling that he needed to drain life energy from other humans or animals to survive.

When Karl's father died, Mr. Anderssen took Karl into his home in thanks for rescuing Tanya. As the years passed, Karl and Tanya fell in love, but Tanya's wealthy father would not allow her to date Karl because of his lack of wealth. In an effort to win Mr. Anderssen's support, Karl went to medical school and became a physician, geneticist, and hypnotherapist. He treated patients through hypnosis, but secretly robbed them of energy at the same time.

First transformation into Sauron and life in the Savage Land
Dr. Lykos became a colleague of Professor Charles Xavier, and first encountered the X-Men when they sought treatment for Havok. Absorbing Havok's mutant energy transformed him into a vampiric, pterodactyl-like monster with human intelligence and superhuman hypnotic powers. He named himself Sauron, after J.R.R. Tolkien's villain (also reminiscent of the word saurus, Latin for lizard), and battled the X-Men, as a would-be conqueror. When he realized that his transformation would threaten Tanya, he fled to Tierra del Fuego. Without energy to absorb, Sauron turned back into Karl. When Tanya tracked him down, Karl threw himself off a cliff to avoid harming her.

Karl was presumed dead, but had survived unconscious on a ledge below. He journeyed to the Savage Land and survived in human form by only draining less developed animals. He befriended Ka-Zar and used his medical skills over many months to care for Ka-Zar's allies. But when several X-Men were stranded in the Savage Land, Lykos was overwhelmed with the desire to absorb the powerful life energy of mutants. He transformed into Sauron once again after absorbing Storm's energy. He reverted to human form during a battle with the X-Men, and Ka-Zar explained that Lykos was an ally.

Tanya learned that Karl had survived the leap from the cliff. She joined Angel and Peter Parker on a journey to find Karl in the Savage Land. They found Karl, however the Savage Land Mutates used a Genetic Transformer to mutate Angel, Spider-Man and Tanya into animal-like forms. The destruction of the machine forced Lykos to drain energy from the three in an attempt to restore their true forms. Although his gambit succeeded, he subsequently reverted to his Sauron form and joined the Mutates and Zaladane. The X-Men traveled to the Savage Land, and Sauron helped to capture them. However, the X-Men escaped and defeated Sauron and the Mutates. They brought Lykos back to the United States, and at the X-Mansion Professor X seemingly cured Lykos of his condition. Karl and Tanya decided to resume their relationship and a normal life.

Second transformation into Sauron
Lykos was again transformed into Sauron when the Toad used a device of his own design to force Lykos to drain the life energy of Tanya, which killed her in the process. Sauron then joined the Toad's Brotherhood of Evil Mutants, despite the fact that he is not a mutant. Alongside them, he battled X-Force, and slew Cannonball. Sauron was apparently shot dead by Cable, and his body was thrown by Cable to the Morlocks. Sauron was later revealed to have survived the gunshot wound, and battled X-Factor. Sauron went on to menace the X-Men and other heroes on a number of occasions.

Later, Sauron had the Savage Land Mutates kidnap Havok, hoping to use his energy to satiate his hunger. When his teammates Cyclops, Phoenix, and Polaris came to the rescue, Sauron had both Summers brothers placed in an energy-transferring machine, and the mix of energy mutated Sauron even further, making him larger and stronger than ever. Phoenix tried to engage Sauron on the Astral Plane, but it was Lykos' personality who prevailed, making a suicide leap into the abyss of his own mind, taking his hated alter ego with him. As a result, Sauron's mind appeared to be stuck in an animalistic state.

Sauron became a prisoner of the Weapon X program jumpstarted by director Malcolm Colcord. Being held there against his will, Sauron started up a revolution with fellow agent Brent Jackson and dethroned Colcord as director, giving that position to Jackson. Sauron in return became a more powerful villain on the team, but vanished after Weapon X rival John Sublime launched an attack on Weapon X, and the group had to go underground.

After being imprisoned in the Raft for refusing to participate in any more Weapon X assignments, Sauron escaped during a jailbreak concocted by the Skrulls. For a time the Avengers believed he and the Mutates were responsible for the breakout, and pursued him to the Savage Land. Sauron and his allies there briefly held the new team of Avengers hostage, but the team freed itself thanks to Iron Man's voice-activated armor, and were about to interrogate him, when he was shot through the head by the second Black Widow. Sauron had absorbed Wolverine's regenerative healing factor and recovered from his injury, just in time to be soundly defeated by the New Avengers. He was taken back into custody, but not before returning the favor to Black Widow by burning her with his fiery breath. Sauron was placed in S.H.I.E.L.D. custody and Maria Hill planned to return him to Weapon X.

Sauron allied with Ka-Zar, Shanna the She-Devil, Zabu, and the natives when the Skrulls were invading the Savage Land. Sauron was among the villains analyzed by Quasimodo for Norman Osborn. Sauron later had a fight with Wolverine.

Amphibius later tells Sauron and the other Savage Land Mutates that Magneto's Asteroid M has risen from the sea, but they did not want to go find him. Worm took control of Barbarus, Lupo, and Sauron and commandeered a ship to go find Magneto. When threatened by the Japanese military, Sauron attacked an armored car, causing an international incident. Cannonball, Sunspot and Warlock investigated and found the Savage Land Mutates on the deck of the ship. Cannonball managed to defeat Sauron while the other New Mutants defeated the Savage Land Mutates. Upon learning why the Savage Land Mutates were on the ship, Karma told Worm, Sauron, Barbarus and Lupo that they were in charge of Asteroid M and Magneto. Worm then orders the Savage Land Mutates to return to the Savage Land.

Upon becoming the new leader of the Japanese underworld, Sabretooth held a party that Sauron attended with other enemies of Wolverine. Wolverine arrived and beat them up.

Kade Kilgore of the seventh incarnation of the Hellfire Club recruited Sauron to become a staff member at the Hellfire Academy.

Sauron later collaborates with Stegron in a plan to turn humanity into dinosaurs where they fought Spider-Man and the mutant students from the Jean Grey School for Higher Learning. The duo's plans are unraveled by their own infighting, purposely exacerbated by their mutual attraction to Shark-Girl, who caused their powers to neutralize each other.

Lykos returns working in a military laboratory to enhance his powers, until one of his colleagues is contacted by the Scarlet Spider. Now able to store mutant energy to trigger his transformations at will, Lykos turns into Sauron and attacks the vigilante, but although he wounds the man the Spider came to the base to collect, Sauron is defeated and webbed up to be taken away.

Powers and abilities
In human form Karl Lykos is a normal human, although an accomplished medical doctor, geneticist, and psychotherapist employing hypnotism. He possesses an M.D. and Ph.D. in genetics and psychology.

As the result of mutation through infection with a genetic virus by mutant pteranodons, Lykos gained the ability to absorb the life forces of other living creatures into his body. After feeding on baseline humans and animals, Lykos discovered that when he absorbs the energies of mutants, he transforms into Sauron (essentially a were-pteranodon). He later gained the ability to also temporarily gain a portion of that mutant's powers, similar to Rogue, when feeding on their life force. He would revert to human form if he did not regularly absorb the life force from mutants. Some depictions of Sauron did not limit his transformations to mutant life energies, but also those of other superpowered individuals. In Spider-Man and the X-Men, Sauron demonstrated the ability to transfer his life-absorption power to others via bite. He transferred this power to Stegron and offered it to Shark-Girl. By the time he confronts the Scarlet Spider, Lykos has developed his powers to the point where he can store mutant energy to trigger his transformation into Sauron without the need for contact with mutants.

Lykos' Sauron form resembles a large crested pteranodon, extinct except in the Savage Land. Unlike true pteranodons, Sauron has a toothed beak and orange eyes and a basically humanoid build, with legs as long as a human being's. Sauron has a wingspread of twelve feet, and razor-sharp claws on his hands and feet. In Sauron form he has superhuman strength, speed, intelligence, stamina, and durability and is capable of flight. The Toad's technology could transform Lykos into Sauron by draining life energy from Tayna Andersson, who is apparently not superhuman.

Lykos also has a powerful hypnotic ability that requires direct eye contact to complete. He frequently uses his hypnotic power to give his victims terrifying delusions that allies have become monsters. He can also mentally enslave people to do his bidding, although his control is not perfect, as Portal is resistant to his commands.

Due to manipulation by the Weapon X program, Sauron can expel the life force energy in concussive bursts from his hands.

At some point prior to his New Avengers appearances, he acquires an additional ability to breathe fire, which he uses to burn the second Black Widow in revenge for shooting him.

Other versions

Age of Apocalypse
In the Age of Apocalypse universe, Sauron, redubbed Soaron is a more heroic figure, though he is extremely bad-tempered and reclusive, and he is never seen in human form. He is a member of Forge's group of Outcasts alongside Forge, Toad, Brute, Sonique, Mastermind and Nate Grey. The group traveled the countryside posing as a circus troupe, protected by Mastermind's illusions, in order to keep attention away from them while Forge trained Nate. Soaron would often make sarcastic remarks about the situations the group found themselves in, and constantly referred to Nate as a "whelp". In a mission where the group rescued a large number of humans from a prison train, one of Soaron's wings was seared off, grounding him. He bitterly remarked about this to Forge later, demanding to know if his wing was enough reason to avoid suicidal missions. When Domino and her team attacked the group, Soaron was noticeably absent, but after Nate went to challenge Mister Sinister, who had been hiding with the team attempting to manipulate Nate, Soaron and Sonique, the only survivors, arrived on the scene to save the young mutant. Nate accepted that he must challenge Apocalypse, and told Soaron to look after Sonique. Soaron replied by somewhat fondly advising him, "Don't concern yourself with us, just worry about yourself, whelp".

When the Age of Apocalypse was revisited, Soaron appeared along with Sonique, Cloak and Dagger, Blob, and a revived Jean Grey as a member of Sinister's team known as the Sinister Six, a group meant to aid Sinister in destroying the X-Men. It is revealed that Sinister apparently still in the guise of Essex approached both Soaron and Sonique, and with Jean Grey's assistance, brainwashed them into becoming members of his new team - the Sinister Six. When the Sinister Six met the X-Men in battle, Soaron failed in his attempt to kill Magneto. At the last moment, Quicksilver prevented his father's death by sacrificing himself. Enraged at the sight of his dead son, Magneto used his powers to thrust the Silver Samurai's sword straight through Soaron, killing him.

Earth X
In the Earth X universe, Beast claims that, after accidentally killing Gambit with a kiss, Rogue sought to rid herself of her powers through Sauron's draining abilities, but ended up losing her life as well.

House of M
In the House of M universe, Sauron became a member of Magneto's palace guard on Genosha. He takes part in the battle against the heroes whose memories have been restored.

Power Pack (Marvel Adventures)
In the mini-series Wolverine and Power Pack, Sauron was the first villain faced by Logan and the Power children. The kids would have succumbed to Sauron's mind control without Wolverine's assistance.

In other media

Television
 Sauron appeared in the X-Men: The Animated Series episode "Savage Land, Savage Heart", voiced by Robert Bockstael. This version does not possess the fire breath or sonic scream of his comic book counterpart and is an inhabitant of the Savage Land. Additionally, Lykos was the victim of Mister Sinister's experiments who was forced to feed on energy and transformed into Sauron upon mutant contact. Sauron aides Mister Sinister in his efforts to destroy the X-Men and later attempts to conquer the Savage Land for himself, but is ultimately defeated. With no mutants left in the Savage Land, Lykos is free to live in peace and welcomed into Ka-Zar's tribe.
 Sauron appears in Hulk and the Agents of S.M.A.S.H., voiced by Steve Blum. In the episode "Savage Land", the agents of S.M.A.S.H. arrive in the titular region just as Sauron leads an army of laser-mounted pteranodons and Devil Dinosaur in attacking them. During the fight, She-Hulk and Skaar discover the villain's plot to use a super drill loaned to him by the Leader in a local super volcano. After being freed from Sauron's control, Devil Dinosaur assists the agents of S.M.A.S.H. in foiling the villain's plot, though Sauron escapes. In "Mission Impossible Man", Sauron attacks a seaside amusement park with an army of prehistoric sea creatures. While the agents of S.M.A.S.H. and Impossible Man intervene and trap him, the villain drains the latter's powers and uses them to summon Fin Fang Foom. However, the monster knocks him away once Sauron's absorbed powers wear off. In "Monsters No More", Sauron joins the Leader's "agents of C.R.A.S.H." to discredit the agents of S.M.A.S.H.
 Two alternate timeline versions of Sauron, King Sauron and a version who was fused with a Frost Giant, appear in the five-part episode "Days of Future Smash".

Video games
 Sauron makes a cameo appearance in the original X-Men game for the Sega Genesis.
 Sauron makes a minor appearance in the Savage Land arena in X-Men: Next Dimension.
 Sauron appears as a boss in X-Men Legends II: Rise of Apocalypse, voiced by John Kassir.
 Sauron makes a brief appearance in Ultimate Spider-Man.
 Sauron appears as a boss in Marvel Heroes, voiced by Steven Blum. 
 Sauron appears as a boss in the Facebook game Marvel: Avengers Alliance.
 Sauron is playable in Marvel Contest of Champions.

Reception
Sauron was ranked #17 on a listing of Marvel Comics' monster characters in 2015.

Comic Book Resources named him as the 8th top X-Men villain they would like to see in the Marvel Cinematic Universe.

In 2020, CBR.com ranked the Sauron 7th in their "Marvel: Dark Spider-Man Villains, Ranked From Lamest To Coolest" list.

References

External links
 Sauron at Marvel.com
 
 

Characters created by Neal Adams
Characters created by Roy Thomas
Comics characters introduced in 1969
Fictional characters with absorption or parasitic abilities 
Fictional characters with dissociative identity disorder
Fictional characters with superhuman durability or invulnerability
Fictional hypnotists and indoctrinators
Fictional physicians
Fictional psychiatrists
Fictional pterosaurs
Fictional reptilians
Fictional therianthropes
Marvel Comics characters who are shapeshifters
Marvel Comics characters who can move at superhuman speeds
Marvel Comics characters who have mental powers
Marvel Comics characters with superhuman strength
Marvel Comics male supervillains
Marvel Comics mutates
Marvel Comics scientists
Marvel Comics vampires